Galvani is an Italian surname derived from Galvano, from Latin Galbinus and Galba.

 Pelagio Galvani (c. 1165–1230), Portuguese cardinal
 Luigi Galvani (1737–1798), Italian biologist
 Stefano Galvani (b. 1977), Italian tennis player

See also
 Galvão (Portuguese) and Galvan (Spanish)

Italian-language surnames